Palace 3: The Lost Daughter is a 2014 Chinese television series written and produced by Yu Zheng, starring Yuan Shanshan, Lu Yi, Gao Yunxiang, Shirley Dai and Yang Rong. It is a sequel to the 2012 television series Palace II. The series was first broadcast on Hunan Television in mainland China from 7 April to 4 May 2014.

The series was a commercial success, and set a new ratings record for a drama’s initial broadcast on a provincial-level television channel for the year. It is later followed by the film The Palace (2013 film).

In December 2014, author Chiung Yao won a lawsuit against screenwriter Yu Zheng, claiming that he plagiarized Palace 3 from her 1992 novel Plum Blossom Scar. Yu was ordered to financially compensate Chiung and publicly apologize. He did the latter 6 years later after mounted pressure from 156 industry professionals threatening to boycott Yu.

Plot
This story is set during the reign of the Qianlong Emperor. An orphan named Liancheng was rescued by Hengtai, the son of a general. She fell in love with him, but he instead developed feelings for Jiang Qimei, a woman from a brother.

Hengtai was determined to marry Qimei and Liancheng unhappily left him. Qimei soon abandons Hengtai, and Hengtai realizes his feelings for Liancheng. Jiang Yichen falls in love with Liancheng, and Princess Xingdai falls in love with Hengtai.

Princess Xingdai is a spoiled princess who is enamored with Hengtai. She is also the daughter of the Qianlong Emperor. Hengtai is forced to marry her due to her high social standing. She gives birth to a daughter, but Hengtai has feelings for Liancheng. He marries Liancheng as a concubine, and she suffers the schemes of Princess Xingdai and Hengtai's mother, Nalan Yingyue.

Liancheng's backstory is soon revealed, and she turns into a vicious woman. She drowns Princess Xingdai and Hengtai's young daughter, and causes Xingdai to fall ill. Liancheng even switches faces with Tong Yuxiu, Hengtai's sister-in-law.

Cast

Main 
 Mabel Yuan as Song Liancheng
 Lu Yi as Fuca Hengtai
 Gao Yunxiang as Jiang Yichen
 Shirley Dai as Xingdai
  Yang Rong as Tong Yuxiu

Supporting 
 Alyssa Chia as Xingyu
 Kingdom Yuen as Mother Tan
 Kent Tong as Qianlong Emperor
 Wang Lin as Nalan Yingyue
 Kou Zhenhai as Fucha Wenghadai
 Zhang Yameng as Rumei
 Wang Renjun as Fucha Mingxuan
 Yang Mingna as Hoifa-Nara, the Step Empress
 Alice Chan as Liniang
 Shen Baoping as Minister Tong
 Madina Memet as Baile
 Zhang Tianyang as Guo Xiao
 Zhou Fang as Bu Qingyun
 Zhang Zhehan as Sun Heli
 Shao Min as Qin Xiang

Special appearances
 Bai Shan as Tian Wanniang
 Chen Xiao as Saman
 Huo Zhengyan as A Di
 Liu Xiaoxiao as Renshan
 Yin Xiaotian as General Duolong
 Mao Xiaotong as Chunxi
 Bao Bei'er

Soundtrack

Plagiarism lawsuit
On April 2, 2014, a newspaper quoted actress Shirley Dai claiming that Palace 3: The Lost Daughter was actually based on Taiwanese writer Chiung Yao's 1992 novel Plum Blossom Scar. Writer-producer Yu Zheng then unleashed a rant on his Sina Weibo microblog calling "a certain actress" an attention whore.

Shortly after the drama aired in China on April 8, Chiung Yao released an open letter to China's State Administration of Press, Publication, Radio, Film and Television on April 15 accusing Yu Zheng of blatant plagiarism "unprecedented and beyond my endurance," seeking the immediate suspension of the broadcast of the TV series. Yu denied the claim, saying he was a fan of Chiung Yao with no intention of angering her. On April 28, a team led by Wang Jun from Beijing-based Yingke Law Firm filed a plagiarism lawsuit against Yu. Chiung Yao has received the public support of many, including Ruby Lin who starred in a Yu Zheng drama Beauty's Rival in Palace (2010).

On May 6, writer Li Yaling (李亚玲), who co-wrote 2 Yu Zheng dramas Pretty Maid (2010) and Spell of the Fragrance (2010), offered to be a witness to support Chiung Yao's lawsuit. She claimed that back in 2008 Yu had asked her to "borrow" Plum Blossom Scar'''s story for a new script, but she refused.

On July 14, Yu Zheng's objections to the jurisdiction of the case were denied by Beijing Third Intermediate People's Court.

On December 5, Beijing Third Intermediate People's Court convened the case. Wang Hailin, executive director of Chinese Television Series Screenwriter Association, testified as expert witness for Chiung Yao's camp. On December 12, 109 Chinese screenwriters published a joint statement supporting Chiung Yao's lawsuit against Yu Zheng. A day later, an additional 30 Chinese screenwriters made their support of Chiung Yao known.

On December 25, the court ruled in Chiung Yao's favor, ordering 4 companies to stop distributing and broadcasting Palace 3: The Lost Daughter, also demanding Yu Zheng to publicly apologize, and pay Chiung Yao ¥5 million (around $800,000). China Radio International'' called it a "landmark ruling".

References

External links
 Palace 3: The Lost Daughter on Sina
  Palace 3: The Lost Daughter on Hunan TV

2014 Chinese television series debuts
Television series set in the Qing dynasty
Chinese historical television series
Chinese romance television series
Sequel television series
Television shows involved in plagiarism controversies
Television shows written by Yu Zheng
Television series by Huanyu Film